The Workers' Party for the Political Liberation of Russia (Rabochaya partiya politicheskogo osvobozhdeniyat rossii, abbreviated 'РППОР', RPPOR) was a political party in Russia, founded in 1899. The membership of the party included Grigory Gershuni and Catherine Breshkovsky (who would become two of the key architects of the Socialist-Revolutionary Party) and its membership was predominantly Jewish. The party had its roots in a Minsk workers' study circle founded in 1895. In 1899 the group had around sixty members. The party directed most of its agitation towards Jewish workers, a fact that differed the party from other narodnik groups. The main base of the party was found in Bielorussia (which had a large Jewish population). The party, which functioned as a federation of autonomous local groups, had branches in Minsk, Białystok, Dvisnk, Ekaterinoslav, Zhitomir, Berdichev, and Saint Petersburg.

The party published a programmatic manifesto (edited by Gershuni and L. Rodionova-Kliacho) in 1900, titled "About Freedom". The manifesto identified autocracy as the main enemy of the people (rather than capitalism or the industrialists). The document proposed political terrorism as a means of struggle against Russian despotic rule.

The Workers' Party for the Political Liberation of Russia party was one of the groups that affiliated itself with the Socialist-Revolutionary Party in 1902.

References

Defunct socialist parties in Russia
Political parties in the Russian Empire
Socialist Revolutionary Party